George Seanor Robb (May 18, 1887 – May 14, 1972) was an officer in the United States Army who received the Medal of Honor for his actions during World War I. He later served as the elected Republican Kansas State Auditor from 1935 to 1961.

Biography
Robb was born in Assaria, Kansas on May 18, 1887. He graduated from Park University in Parkville, Missouri in 1912. In 1935, he was appointed by Governor Alfred Landon to the post of Kansas State Auditor as a Republican. He was subsequently elected twelve times before retiring in 1960. He died on May 14, 1972 in Topeka, Kansas. He is buried in Gypsum Hill Cemetery in Salina, Kansas.

Medal of Honor Citation
Rank and organization: First Lieutenant, U.S. Army, 369th Infantry, 93d Division. Place and date: At Sechault, France, September 29-30, 1918. Entered service at: Salina, Kansas. Born: May 18, 1887; Assaria, Kansas. General Orders: War Department, General Orders No. 16 ( January 22, 1919).

Citation:

While leading his platoon in the assault First Lieutenant Robb was severely wounded by machinegun fire, but rather than go to the rear for proper treatment he remained with his platoon until ordered to the dressing station by his commanding officer. Returning within 45 minutes, he remained on duty throughout the entire night, inspecting his lines and establishing outposts. Early the next morning he was again wounded, once again displaying his remarkable devotion to duty by remaining in command of his platoon. Later the same day a bursting shell added two more wounds, the same shell killing his commanding officer and two officers of his company. He then assumed command of the company and organized its position in the trenches. Displaying wonderful courage and tenacity at the critical times, he was the only officer of his battalion who advanced beyond the town, and by clearing machinegun and sniping posts contributed largely to the aid of his battalion in holding their objective. His example of bravery and fortitude and his eagerness to continue with his mission despite severe wounds set before the enlisted men of his command a most wonderful standard of morale and self-sacrifice.

At the time of his decoration Robb was one of only 44 Americans to have been awarded the Medal of Honor for service during World War I.

Military Awards
Robb's military decorations and awards include:

See also

List of Medal of Honor recipients
List of Medal of Honor recipients for World War I

Footnotes

External links

George S Robb Centre for the Study of the Great War|https://gsr.park.edu/

United States Army Medal of Honor recipients
United States Army officers
United States Army personnel of World War I
People from Saline County, Kansas
1887 births
1972 deaths
World War I recipients of the Medal of Honor
Park University alumni
Military personnel from Kansas